The World Junior Memory Championships (WJMC) runs as a subset of the World Memory Championships (WMC). 

All competitors need to be between 13 and 17 years old to qualify. For many countries, in addition to age requirements, one needs to go through a series of regional and national qualification competitions before they can apply for WJMC. The recent champions are from Mongolia, China and Germany.

Recent Championships

References 

Memory games
International competitions
Annual events